Events of 2010 in Italy.

Incumbents
President: Giorgio Napolitano
Prime Minister: Silvio Berlusconi

Events 
 February 16–20: Sanremo Music Festival 2010, the 60th annual edition held in Teatro Ariston in Sanremo, province of Imperia,
 February 23: unknown persons pour millions of liters of hydrocarbons into the Lambro river causing an environmental disaster that involved the valley of the river itself and the Po, in Lombardy and Emilia-Romagna.
 May 1: Pope Benedict XVI will appoint an envoy and a commission to reform Legion of Christ (LC), whose Mexican founder, Marcial Maciel, abused children before being dismissed in 2006.
 September 12: Fernando Alonso wins the Italian Grand Prix. This would be Ferrari's last win at Monza until 2019.

Sports 

 2010–11 Serie A
 2010–11 Serie B
 2010–11 Coppa Italia
 2010 Supercoppa Italiana
 2010 Giro d'Italia
 2010 Italian Grand Prix
 2010 Giro di Lombardia

Deaths 
February 8 – Antonio Giolitti, 94, politician
April 15 – Raimondo Vianello, 87, television presenter
May 5 - Giulietta Simionato, 99, operatic mezzo-soprano
May 18 – Edoardo Sanguineti, 79, poet and writer
July 8 – Lelio Luttazzi, 87, composer and television presenter
August 17 – Francesco Cossiga, 82, politician and former President
September 21 – Sandra Mondaini, 79, actress 
November 10 – Dino De Laurentiis, 91, film producer 
November 29 – Mario Monicelli, 95, actor, screenwriter and director 
November 30 – Berardino Libonati, 76, academic, businessman, jurist and lawyer
December 18 – Tommaso Padoa-Schioppa, 70, economist and former minister
December 21 – Enzo Bearzot, 83, footballer and football coach

See also
 2010 in Italian television
 List of Italian films of 2010

References

 
Italy, 2010 In